Eric Stocz (born May 25, 1974) is a former American football tight end. He played for the Detroit Lions from 1996 to 1997 and for the New York/New Jersey Hitmen in 2001.

References

1974 births
Living people
American football tight ends
Westminster Titans football players
Detroit Lions players
New York/New Jersey Hitmen players